The Treaty of Peace Between Japan and India (日本国とインドとの間の平和条約)  was a peace treaty signed on June 9, 1952 restoring relations between the two nations.

The British Empire, of which India was a part, had full diplomatic relations with Japan became involved in World War II. After the war Japan was under American occupation and India gained its independence on August 15, 1947. In 1951, the San Francisco Peace Conference was held with Indian Prime Minister Jawaharlal Nehru refusing to attend the conference, because he considered the provisions of the San Francisco Treaty to be limiting Japanese sovereignty, as seen to this day with the San Francisco System managed by the United States.

See also
Indian independence movement
Treaty of Peace with Japan
India–Japan relations

References

External links
Treaty of Peace Between Japan and India George Washington University
日印平和条約（日本国とインドとの間の平和条約） Tokyo University
Treaty of Peace between the Governments of India and Japan Ministry of External Affairs, India
 Hiroshi Sato, "India-Japan Peace Treaty in Japan's Post-War Asian Diplomacy" Journal of the Japanese Association for South Asian Studies, vol. 17(2005)

India–Japan relations
1952 in India
1952 in Japan
Peace treaties of Japan
Peace treaties of India
Treaties concluded in 1952
Bilateral treaties of Japan
Bilateral treaties of India
1952 in Japanese politics